Darren Campbell Smith (born 14 November 1973) is a former New Zealand field hockey player, who earned his first cap for the national team, nicknamed The Black Sticks, in 1995 against Spain. He represented New Zealand at the 2004 Summer Olympics.

Smith is currently the Head Coach of the Black Sticks a role he has had since 2017. During his time in charge of the side they have earned a silver medal at the Commonwealth Games in the Gold Coast in 2018.

He played at two Commonwealth Games, in 1998 and 2002, winning a silver medal at the latter. His career further spans two World Cups. Smith resides in Auckland.

International senior tournaments
 1995 – Sultan Azlan Shah Cup, Kuala Lumpur
 1997 – World Cup Qualifier, Kuala Lumpur
 1998 – Sultan Azlan Shah Cup, Kuala Lumpur
 1998 – Commonwealth Games, Kuala Lumpur
 1998 – World Cup, Utrecht
 1999 – Sultan Azlan Shah Cup, Kuala Lumpur
 2000 – Olympic Qualifying Tournament, Osaka
 2001 – World Cup Qualifier, Edinburgh
 2002 – 2002 Men's Hockey World Cup, Kuala Lumpur
 2002 – Commonwealth Games, Manchester
 2003 – Sultan Azlan Shah Cup, Kuala Lumpur
 2003 – Champions Challenge
 2004 – Olympic Qualifying Tournament, Madrid
 2004 – Champions Trophy, Lahore
 2005 – Sultan Azlan Shah Cup, Kuala Lumpur
 2006 – World Cup Qualifier
 2006 – Commonwealth Games, Melbourne

References

External links

New Zealand male field hockey players
Male field hockey midfielders
Field hockey players at the 1998 Commonwealth Games
1998 Men's Hockey World Cup players
Field hockey players at the 2002 Commonwealth Games
2002 Men's Hockey World Cup players
Field hockey players at the 2004 Summer Olympics
Field hockey players at the 2006 Commonwealth Games
Olympic field hockey players of New Zealand
Commonwealth Games silver medallists for New Zealand
1973 births
Living people
Sportspeople from Napier, New Zealand
Commonwealth Games medallists in field hockey
Ireland women's national field hockey team coaches
New Zealand field hockey coaches
New Zealand Olympic coaches
Medallists at the 2002 Commonwealth Games